Choi Min-gi (born November 3, 1995), known professionally as Ren, is a South Korean singer, actor and television personality. He began his professional career in 2012 as a vocalist of the South Korean boy group NU'EST. Following his contract's expiration in Pledis Entertainment in March 2022, Choi established his career as a solo artist signed under BPM Entertainment.

Career

Pre-debut

Ren was accepted into Pledis Entertainment after auditioning in 2010. Prior to debuting, Ren appeared as a back-up dancer in After School Blue's "Wonder Boy" in 2011. He participated in Pledis Entertainment's Christmas single "Love Letter" and was also featured in an alternate music video for the song as a member of Pledis Boys. He performed with After School with the rest of Pledis Boys, now dubbed "After School Boys", at the SBS Gayo Daejeon.

2012-2022: NU'EST

Along with four other Pledis Boys, Ren debuted in the boy band NU'EST in 2012 as a sub-vocalist. He also modeled for Park Yoon-so during the Fall/Winter Seoul Fashion Week, and his androgynous styling drew attention for breaking gender norms. In 2013, Ren appeared Jeon Woo-chi in a minor role. In 2015, he starred in the Japanese film Their Distance.

In 2017, Ren participated as a contestant on Produce 101 Season 2 under his full name for a chance to debut in Wanna One, but he was eliminated in the final episode at rank #20. After the show's end, he and the remaining NU'EST members began promoting as the sub-group NU'EST W from 2017 to 2018. During the group's activity, he wrote the lyrics for his solo songs, "Paradise" and "You & I." At the same time, Ren became a fixed panelist on the talk show Learning the Hard Way. He was also cast in a starring role on the drama Four Sons, but the show's production was briefly suspended in 2018 with only four of sixteen episodes filmed.

In 2018, Ren became a regular cast member on The Kkondae Live. In 2019, he became a regular cast member on Hogu Chart.

From 2020 to 2021, Ren hosted the radio show "To.Night" on Naver NOW with bandmate Aron. He also began his musical theatre career as the lead role in Everybody's Talking About Jamie in 2020 and in Hedwig and the Angry Inch in 2021.

NU'EST's exclusive contract with Pledis Entertainment expired on March 14, 2022 and Ren (alongside members Aron and JR) will leave the agency, therefore concluding their 10-year career as a group.

2022-present: solo activities
In May 2022, Ren signed with BPM Entertainment as a solo artist. In the same month, Ren also joined the platform Universe.

In September 2022, it was confirmed by his agency that Ren would hold a solo fan-con event '2022 Ren Fan-Con [The Day After]' in Korea and Japan in early November.

Philanthropy 
On April 18, 2018, Ren hand-delivered two piggy banks to the Korea Pediatric Cancer Foundation to support the latter's "Creating My Own Angel Contest" campaign. The following year, he and NU'EST member Minhyun brought the children of the foundation to NU'EST's 2019 LOVE Page Fan Meeting in Seoul. In December of the same year, Ren donated all the proceeds of his self-published fairy tale book “함께라서 행복한 우리들" (literally translated as "We're Happy Because We're Together") to the foundation.

Discography

Filmography

Films

Television series

Television shows

Radio shows

Theatre

References

External links

1995 births
Living people
Musicians from Busan
Pledis Entertainment artists
BPM Entertainment artists
South Korean male idols
South Korean male pop singers
South Korean male film actors
South Korean male television actors
21st-century South Korean male singers
21st-century South Korean male actors
Produce 101 contestants